Spoons Across America is a national non-profit organization founded in 2001 providing children's food, nutrition, education, and networking for providers. Spoons Across America is a member of America's Charities.

References

External links
 Home page
 Spoons Across America - America's Charities

Children's charities based in the United States
Charities based in New York (state)
Organizations established in 2001
2001 establishments in the United States